Ulsan Baseball Stadium is a baseball stadium in Ok-dong, Ulsan, South Korea. The stadium has an all-seated capacity of 12,088. It serves as the second home of the Lotte Giants.

References

Baseball venues in South Korea
Lotte Giants
Buildings and structures in Ulsan
Sport in Ulsan
Sports venues completed in 2014
2014 establishments in South Korea